The Georgetown Cenotaph is a war memorial in Georgetown, Guyana, located at the junction of Main and Church Streets.

The Cenotaph was unveiled on August 14, 1923, by the then Governor, Graeme Thomson, and the first Armistice Day observance took place at the Church Street Monument on 11 November 1923. On the four faces of the base of the Cenotaph are inscribed the four words - Devotion, Humanity, Fortitude, and Sacrifice.

The Cenotaph is a national memorial to Guyanese soldiers who lost their lives in the First and Second World Wars. Guyanese soldiers served and fought in such far off places as Egypt, France, Belgium, and East Africa.

After the end of the Second World War in 1945, Armistice Day was renamed Remembrance Day or Remembrance Sunday, and observed on the first or second Sunday of November. Since 1956, it was internationally agreed to observe Remembrance Day on the second Sunday of November.

Before 1923, the site where the Cenotaph now stands was occupied by an ornate drinking fountain which was erected in 1867 to mark the completion of the Water Works in 1866. That drinking fountain, no longer functional, now stands on the green opposite St. Rose's High School in Church Street, just a few hundred feet from its original location.

References

Buildings and structures in Georgetown, Guyana
Cenotaphs
Monuments and memorials in Guyana
World War I memorials
World War II memorials
Historic sites in Guyana
British Guiana in World War II
World War II sites in British Guiana